Adel may refer to:

Places

United States 
 Adel, Georgia
 Adel, Indiana
 Adel, Iowa
 Adel Township, Dallas County, Iowa
 Adel, Oklahoma
 Adel, Oregon
 Adel Mountains Volcanic Field, West-central Montana

Elsewhere
 Adelaide, Australia
 Adel, Leeds, England
 Adilabad, Telangana, India
 Adilabad district, Telangana, India
 Al-Adel, Baghdad, Iraq
 Adel, Republic of Bashkortostan, Russia
 Adel Sultanate

People
Adel (name), a unisex first name of northern-European origin, or a last name
Adil, an Arabic first name (male) and last name

Other uses 
Adel (official), a public official in Morocco
Adel, German nobility
Adel, Dutch nobility
Adel, Danish nobility
Adel, Swedish nobility
Adel, Norwegian nobility
Adel, Finnish nobility
Adel, Icelandic nobility
Adel, an Egyptian ferry that capsized and sank in May 1963
Adel, a game character of Final Fantasy VIII
Adel, a weevil/beetle genus of the Pentarthrini tribe

See also 
Adelaide (disambiguation)
Adele (disambiguation)
Aedile, an office of the Roman Republic
Aetheling, an Old English noble title